The MAN Lion's City is a range of low-floor and low-entry public buses built by German truck and bus manufacturer MAN Truck & Bus (previously MAN Nutzfahrzeuge) since 1996 primarily for the European market, but is also available in chassis-only variants worldwide. The name Lion's City has been used since 2006, when MAN's public bus models which had been marketed separately were gathered into one range, when also most models received a facelift. The first models to be introduced were the 12-metre low-floor intercity bus NÜ xx3 (A20) in 1996, the 12-metre city bus NL xx3 (A21) in 1997 and the articulated NG xx3 (A23) in 1998. As with former MAN bus models the power-rating made up part of the model name, giving the NÜ-series buses with power-ratings of 260 and 310 hp model names NÜ 263 and NÜ 313 respectively. The main production sites are in Starachowice and Sady in Poland, but the models have also been built in Germany, Turkey and Malaysia. Initially most of the midibus variants were manufactured by Göppel Bus in Augsburg, later Nobitz.

Models are available with a 6-cylinder turbocharged straight engine which runs on diesel, compressed natural gas or liquefied petroleum gas. Versions with hydrogen fuel cell drive and with hydrogen internal combustion engines have been successfully tested, as well as diesel-electric hybrid drive. A production hybrid-electric version, the Lion's City Hybrid, which uses supercapacitors and two 67 kW electric motors is available since 2010. Hybrid electric buses offer increased efficiency in urban traffic and use 30% less fuel than combustion-only buses.

The latest generation of Neoplan Centroliner is based on the Lion's City (Neoplan was also part of the Neoman Bus group).

Integral variants 
Codes inside parentheses are internal codes that identify some technical characteristics of the variants, like length/wheelbase, number of axles, floor height, width, engine arrangement and so on. Some codes are unique to one variant, while others are shared between variants. Some variants have changed from one code to another over time. These codes are sometimes mistakenly used as a model designation. One can find the codes in VINs (i.e. WMAA21...) and in vehicle production serial numbers (i.e. A210012).

Current 
City (low-floor)
 Lion's City 12, 12 m single-decker diesel
Lion's City 12 G, 12 m single-decker CNG
Lion's City 12 E, 12 m single-decker electric
Lion's City 18, 18 m articulated diesel
Lion's City 18 G, 18 m articulated CNG
Lion's City, known as NL xx3 1997–2004 – 12 m single-decker
 horizontal engine (A21)
 vertical engine (A37), since 2002
 Lion's City Hybrid (A37) - 12 m hybrid single-decker
 Lion's City C (A26, A36 since 2013) - 13.7 m single-decker
 Lion's City L (A26), known as NL xx3 - 15 m 1998–2004, Lion's City LL 2004–2009 - 14.7 m single-decker
 Lion's City G (A23), known as NG xx3 1998–2004 – 18 m articulated
 Lion's City GL (A23, A40 since 2011) - 18.75 m articulated
 Lion's City M - 10.5 m midibus
 2.38 m wide (A35)
 2.5 m wide (A47)

City (low-entry)
 Lion's City LE (A78), known as EL xx3 2003–2004, Lion's City T 2004–2008 - 12m single-decker
 version based on standard low-floor, horizontal engine platform (A21), including CNG version, available since 2011(?)
 version for South African market - bodied on 18.280 HOCL-NL/R (A84) chassis by MAN South Africa in Olifantsfontein since 2011
 Lion's City C LE (A26, A45 since 2013?) - 13.7 m single-decker
 Lion's City L LE (A26, A44 since 2012?) - 14.7 m single-decker
 Lion's City G LE (A42) - 18 m articulated
 Lion's City GL LE (A49) - 18.75 m articulated

Intercity (low-floor)
 Lion's City Ü (A20), known as NÜ xx3 1996–2004 - 12m single-decker

Intercity (low-entry)
 Lion's City LE Ü (A78), known as EL xx3 2003–2004, Lion's City TÜ 2004–2008 - 12m single-decker

Discontinued 
City (low-floor)
 Lion's City DD (A39) - 13.73 m double-decker
 Lion's City GXL (A43) - 20.45 m articulated
 Lion's City M, known as NM xx3 and EM xx3 until 2005 - 8.13 m to 11.21 m midibus, bodied on 10/11.xxx HOCL (469), 12.xxx HOCL-NL (A76), 14.xxx HOCL-NL (A66) and NL xx3 F (A22) chassis by Göppel Bus

Intercity (low-floor)
 Lion's City ÜLL (A25), known as NÜ xx3 - 15 m 1998–2004 - 14.7 m single decker

Type designation system 
The type designations were used to define all models prior to 2004. With the introduction of the model names in 2004, the system is still in use on all vehicles, but is more for internal use. In most cases it can be found on the plate inside the bus where one find the VIN.

Floor height
 N: Low-floor bus
 E: Low-entry bus (Some low-entry versions have letter N instead when they are built technically similar to the low-floor version.)
Adaption
 L: Rigid bus (no special adaption)
 D: Double-decker bus
 G: Articulated bus
 M: Midibus
 Ü: Intercity bus
Power code
 xx: First two digits of power output in hp (nearest ten)
 3: third generation
 F: Denotes that it is built as a chassis for external bodywork

For example, an ND323F low-floor double-decker bus has a power output of 320 hp.

Chassis variants (for external bodywork) 
Low-floor chassis variants are offered for external bodywork by local bodywork manufacturers. Most are bodied in the local manufacturer's own styling, but some are licensed to replicate the Lion's City bodywork, usually in markets where MAN don't sell the integral variants. This includes the East Lancs Kinetec for the UK market, which only replicate the front part and Gemilang Coachworks's version of the Lion's City, replicating the whole LHD bodywork for their (usually RHD) buses sold in Asia Pacific market, including the Lion's City Hybrid bodywork mounted on conventional diesel chassis.
 NLxx3F (A22) - single-decker bus, horizontal engine, 10.5 m – 12.0 m
 NDxx3F (A34/A48/A95) - double-decker bus, 10.85 m – 12.8 m. They have only been built in very small numbers and only for right-hand drive markets.
 NGxx3F (A24) - articulated bus, horizontal engine, 18.0 m – 18.75 m
 NMxx3F (A35) - midibus, vertical engine, 9.7 m – 10.4 m

Double Decker

MAN ND313F / ND363F (A34)
The MAN ND313F and MAN ND363F, with the chassis code A34, is a tri-axle 12-metre chassis. A total number of 27 chassis were built between 2003 and 2006.

In 2003, Kowloon Motor Bus (KMB) of Hong Kong received one MAN ND313F with Neoplan Centroliner N4426 bodywork, it received fleet number APM1 and registration number LE4612, entering service later in the same year. The bus remained unique in Kowloon Motor Bus fleet. It was retired in January 2019.

25 ND363F received Ayats coach bodywork, and were delivered to Ulsterbus of Northern Ireland in 2006.

MAN ND243F / ND283F (A48)

In 2006, a 10.85-metre two-axle version was launched as the MAN ND243F and MAN ND283F, with chassis code A48.

One ND283F received an East Lancs Kinetec+ bodywork, which had a front similar to that of MAN Lion's City.

Two more ND283F test chassis were built, but no ND243F.

MAN ND323F / ND363F (A95)
In 2013, a new double deck chassis based on the A22-series low floor single-decker chassis was launched as the MAN ND323F and MAN ND363F, with a new chassis code A95. Currently, the bodywork of all A95 buses are built by Gemilang Coachworks and are based on the licensed MAN Lion's City DD design, and is also marketed in various markets as the MAN Lion's City DD for the 12 m long variant and the MAN Lion's City DD L for the 12.8m long variant. A concept bodywork design was unveiled in 2015, in the form of a 3-door bus built for Singapore's Land Transport Authority (LTA). Currently, a refreshed design based on the concept is being adopted on the newer buses. In addition, the Australian market buses feature a different rear end design as compared to those sold in other markets.

Singapore

In November 2014, SMRT was given a single MAN ND323F demonstrator for trial purposes at the manufacturer's request. Following a successful trial run, SMRT ordered 16 MAN ND323Fs which were delivered between August and November 2015 with tree guards pre-installed.

In late 2015, the Land Transport Authority ordered 60 units as part of the Bus Contracting Model (BCM) order. Largely similar to the previous batch procured by SMRT Buses, these buses had some minor differences in appearance such as the omission of tree guards. The final 10 units of this batch were equipped with USB charging ports. The first 15 buses were painted in SMRT's corporate livery, while the rest featured LTA's green livery. All of these buses were registered between April and August 2016 and are currently assigned to SMRT Buses and Tower Transit.

Also in late 2015, a 12.8 m long custom built MAN ND323F with 3 doors and 2 staircases was built for the LTA, featuring an updated concept bodywork design. Originally deployed to Tower Transit in 2017, it was transferred to SBS Transit in early 2018.

In September 2016, LTA ordered another 122 MAN ND323Fs which were put into service in 2017. These buses contain similar specifications with the previous batch but with an updated bodywork design, with the first 30 units being based on the concept and the rest with an updated design. These buses were assigned to SBS Transit, SMRT Buses, Tower Transit and Go-Ahead Singapore, with most units in SMRT Buses replacing retiring Mercedes-Benz O405G bendy buses.

In late 2017, under a negotiated tender, the Land Transport Authority ordered 250 MAN buses, which were 150 MAN NL323Fs and 100 MAN ND323Fs, equipped with Euro VI engines and minor differences to the bodywork in the previous batch. These buses were equipped with two wheelchair bays as compared to one in previous batches. An option was excised in 2018 to procure an additional 150 MAN ND323Fs in this batch. These buses entered revenue service in May 2018 and are currently assigned to SBS Transit, SMRT Buses, Tower Transit and Go-Ahead Singapore for fleet additions and replacement of retiring buses.

In July 2018, a tender was awarded by LTA to ST Kinetics for the procurement of 111 MAN ND323Fs, which were delivered with subtle differences as compared to the earlier batches. These buses entered service in March 2020, with the final bus delivered in October 2021. Similar to the previous batch, these buses are currently assigned to SBS Transit and SMRT Buses for fleet additions and replacement of retiring buses.

Following the successful trial of the three door MAN ND323F, the Land Transport Authority announced that 50 production batch 3-door ND323Fs will be procured along with 50 3-door Alexander Dennis Enviro500s. These buses entered service in January 2021.

Hong Kong
In August 2014, Kwoon Chung Motors Company (KCM) ordered 9 ND323Fs replacing 8 Dennis Tridents and 1 MAN 24.310. Also, KCM's subsidiary company New Lantau Bus (NLB) purchased 10 ND323Fs. They were delivered to Hong Kong in June and August 2015 respectively. Moreover, in 2017, NLB purchased 16 ND363Fs with Gemilang Lion's city DD facelift body, they were delivered to Hong Kong since November 2017 and registered since February 2018. The order has been increased to add another 13 vehicles and registered since June 2018. In 2018, NLB purchased 5 ND363Fs with Gemilang's Lion's city DD facelift body which is equivalent to the previous order and equipped with a Euro 6 engine. They are being delivered to Hong Kong since February 2019.

In May 2015, an ND363F was delivered to Kowloon Motor Bus (KMB) of Hong Kong and was first used during August 2015. In October 2015, KMB placed an order for 20 ND323Fs with Gemilang Lion's City DD body. In 2017, KMB ordered one ND323F with Gemilang self-build body and equipped with Navaho LCD display.

New World First Bus also ordered a 12.8m long ND323F.

New China Lane Travel, To Yo Travel and Goldspark Hong Kong Tours have also ordered ND323Fs in open top form.

Discovery Bay Transit Services (DBTSL) from Discovery Bay placed an order of four ND323F in 2016 and delivered in June 2017. They were registered on late-June and mid-July 2017. In 2019, DBTSL ordered 2 ND323F equipped with Euro 6 engine and delivered in January and February 2020. Two new buses were registered and operated in July 2020.

HZMB bus operator has ordered 20 ND363Fs with 4.2m height variant and delivered in 2018. In 2019, HZMB bus operator has ordered 40 ND323Fs with 4.2m height variant and Euro 6 engine. These buses are delivered since April 2019.

Australia
In 2017, State Transit purchased 38 Gemilang Coachworks bodied MAN A95s for its Sydney B-Line service.

Gallery

See also 

 List of buses

References

External links

Lion's City
Buses of Germany
Hybrid electric buses
Tri-axle buses
Low-floor buses
Low-entry buses
Double-decker buses
Midibuses
Articulated buses
Vehicles introduced in 1996